Kráľovská lúka is a nature monument in the Slovak municipality of Bodíky in the Dunajská Streda District. The nature reserve covers an area of 32.4 ha of the Danube floodplain area. It has a protection level of 5 under the Slovak nature protection system. The nature reserve is part of the Dunajské luhy Protected Landscape Area.

Description
The nature monument is formed by a dead branch of the Danube with a stands of typical floodplain forests. The water, swamp and meadow biotopes give home to rare species of flora including the Nymphaea alba and the Galanthus nivalis.

References

Geography of Trnava Region
Protected areas of Slovakia